Otto A. La Budde (June 11, 1865 – October 14, 1940) was an American politician and businessman.

Born in the Town of Rhine, Sheboygan County, Wisconsin, La Budde went to Plymouth High School in Plymouth, Wisconsin. He then worked in a hardware store in Plymouth, Wisconsin. In 1884, La Budde owned and worked in a retail hardware store in the village of  Elkhart Lake, Wisconsin. La Budde was a Democrat and was chairman of the Wisconsin Democratic Party. He served as president of the village of Elkhart Lake, Wisconsin. In 1911, La Budde served in the Wisconsin State Assembly. In 1919, President Woodrow Wilson appointed La Budde customs collector for the Port of Milwaukee, Wisconsin and then, in 1933, President Franklin Roosevelt appointed La Budde internal revenue collector for Wisconsin. In 1940, La Budde died in a hospital in Milwaukee, Wisconsin after an abdominal operation on September 16, 1940.

Notes

1865 births
1940 deaths
People from Elkhart Lake, Wisconsin
Businesspeople from Wisconsin
Mayors of places in Wisconsin
Democratic Party members of the Wisconsin State Assembly